The 2007 Trofeo Federale was a four-team tournament running from September 26 to October 2, 2007. The tournament was won by La Fiorita who defeated Tre Fiori 2–1.

Tournament bracket

Trofeo Federale
Trofeo